On August 9, 1974, President Richard Nixon (a Republican) was forced to resign amid the Watergate scandal. Vice President Gerald Ford ascended to the presidency, leaving the office of vice president vacant. Under the terms of the 25th Amendment, a vice presidential vacancy is filled when the president nominates a candidate who is confirmed by both houses of Congress, which were controlled by the Democrats.

On August 20, 1974, Ford announced his nomination of former New York Governor Nelson Rockefeller to fill the vacancy. Ford also considered picking Tennessee Senator Howard Baker and former Republican National Committee Chairman George H. W. Bush. Rockefeller was generally considered to be a liberal Republican, and Ford decided that picking Rockefeller would help his candidacy gain support in the 1976 presidential election. Rockefeller's nomination dismayed many conservatives; many conservative Democrats and Republicans opposed the nomination. This was especially true among members of the U.S. House of Representatives. However, some House opponents were liberal Democrats who looked askance at some minor improprieties disclosed during Rockefeller's confirmation hearings and whose partisanship had been hardened due to the leftover effects from the political and psychological trauma of Watergate.

The confirmation hearings for Rockefeller lasted for months, but Rockefeller was sworn in as the 41st vice president of the United States on December 19, 1974. Due to the pressure on Ford by the party hardliners, Rockefeller was ultimately passed over for the 1976 ticket, and Ford instead chose Kansas Senator Bob Dole as his running mate. Ford, however, regretted this move later.

Confirmation votes
The Senate approved the nomination of Nelson Rockefeller on December 10, 1974 by a vote of 90 to 7. The following week, on December 19, the House of Representatives gave its approval, 287 to 128. Notably, the seven senators to oppose his nomination were Senators Barry Goldwater of Arizona (R) (who had a feud with Rockefeller dating back to the 1964 Republican presidential primary), Birch Bayh of Indiana (D), Jesse Helms of North Carolina (R), Howard Metzenbaum of Ohio (D), James Abourezk of South Dakota (D), William Scott of Virginia (R), and Gaylord Nelson of Wisconsin (D).

See also

25th Amendment to the United States Constitution
1973 United States vice presidential confirmation

References

External links
 Nelson Rockefeller Confirmation Hearings transcript, Ron Nessen Papers at the Gerald R. Ford Presidential Library.
 Rockefeller's Opening Statement to Senate Rules Committee, YouTube.
 
 Rockefeller Archive Center: Nelson Rockefeller, Contains details on the collection of public and private papers available to researchers at the Center.

Vice presidency of the United States
Gerald Ford
Nelson A. Rockefeller
Twenty-fifth Amendment to the United States Constitution
93rd United States Congress
1974 in American politics